Guo Lianwen is a Chinese actor. He is now the President of Film School of Beijing Central Minzu University and China Children's Art Theatre, he is now the vice-president of China Artist Association.

He has won the Chian Golden Eagle Award, 17th Flying Apsaras Award and 11th China Gold Star Award for his role in Comrade Shaoqi.

Works

Television

Film

Awards

References

Chinese male film actors
Chinese male television actors
Central Academy of Drama alumni
Living people
Year of birth missing (living people)